The Morisco Kiosk (Local: Kiosco Morisco, English: Moorish Kiosk) is a kiosk structure in Colonia Santa María la Ribera in Mexico City, Mexico.  It is situated in the Alameda Park in the center of the Colonia neighborhood, at the intersection of Dr. Atl and Salvador Miron Streets, near Metro Buenavista. The kiosk is built in the neo-Mudejar architectural style that was prevailing in Spain in the 19th century. It is completely made of wrought iron with a glass cupola dome at the top. The kiosk is made of panels that can be disassembled and moved if needed.

History
The Morisco Kiosk was built by José Ramón Ibarrola as the Mexico Pavilion at the 1884 World’s Fair in New Orleans. It was then used for the Saint Louis Exposition in 1902. The Kiosk was brought back to Mexico after the events, and first installed on the south side of the Alameda Central in Mexico City. During the Centennial of the Mexican War of Independence it was decided to be moved to make way for the Benito Juárez Monument. Colonia residents petitioned for it to be moved to its present location.

Architecture

The kiosk is built in the neo-Mudejar architectural style which was popular in Spain when this Kiosk was designed in the 19th century. Its neo-Mudejar style is a revival of the older Moorish influenced Mudejar architectural style. The Kiosk made of wrought iron with a glass cupola dome at top. The kiosk is designed for disassembling and moving when needed.

References

Buildings and structures in Mexico City
Landmarks in Mexico City
Moorish Revival architecture
Relocated buildings and structures
World's fair architecture in North America
Buildings and structures completed in 1884
Mexico–United States relations
Octagonal buildings